Brazilian tea culture has its origins in the infused beverages, or chás, made by the indigenous cultures of the Amazon region and the Rio da Prata basin. It has evolved since the Portuguese colonial period to include imported varieties and tea-drinking customs. There is a popular belief in Brazil that Brazilians, especially the urban ones, have a greater taste for using sugar in teas than in other cultures, being unused to unsweetened drinks.

erva-mate
A popular caffeinated infusion is mate, made from the leaves of the native erva mate plant. In Brazil, the plant is called erva-mate or simply mate, and the hot beverage drunk from a calabash gourd is called chimarrão, typically associated with the southernmost state, Rio Grande do Sul. Mate is a popular beverage in other South American countries as well, specially around the people that lives in the southern region, which comprises the named Gaúcho culture, or the culture from the Pampas. Argentina, Paraguay, and Uruguay. Specially in the Paraguayan and in a few parts of the northern Argentinian border, the mate is also drunk infused in cold water along the daytime, and receives the name of tereré.
As in other South American countries, mate is traditionally drunk from a hollow gourd using a silver straw, a tradition that continues from indigenous cultures who introduced mate to colonists, though in other parts of the country, processed mate is drunk iced, as a non-carbonated soft drink.

Common modern varieties
True teas such as black tea (chá-preto) are popular in Brazil, either hot or iced. Brazilians also have their own local modern variations of flavored and herbal teas. Lemongrass teas are popular. Lemongrass is a plant imported from Southeast Asia, which grows well in Brazil's climate. Lemongrass is called capim-santo, capim-limão or capim cidreira. It is generally consumed in herbal teas and health drinks, which is its primary culinary use in Brazil. Like many infusions in Brazil, lemongrass beverages are considered more medicinal than culinary. One iced drink made of lemongrass and pineapple peelings is called chá de abacaxi com capim-santo.

Alongside lemongrass and mate, infusions from plants cultivated domestically or in local little properties usually served as everyday drinks are Melissa officinalis, the lemon balm, there known as erva-cidreira or citronela, Mentha, the mint, there known as hortelã (though juices are much more popular – tea is usually made from processed dried mint in the market), Kyllinga odorata, in the genus of the plants known as spikesedges, there known as capim-cidreira, Foeniculum vulgare, the fennel, there known as erva-doce or funcho, Pimpinella anisum, the anise, there known as erva-doce or rarely anis, Illicium verum, the Chinese star anise, there known as anis-estrelado, Aloysia citrodora, the South American lemon verbena, there known as lúcia-lima, among some other American, European and Asian plants.

Examples of plants commonly cultivated domestically in Brazil for medicinal uses are Peumus boldus, the boldo, there known as boldo-do-chile, Plectranthus barbatus, the Indian coleus, there known as boldo-de-jardim or boldo-da-terra, Plantago major, the greater plantain, there known as tanchagem, Vernonia condensata, there known as boldo-baiano, Vernonia polysphaera, there known as assa-peixe, Chenopodium ambrosioides, there known as erva-de-santa-maria, Dysphania ambrosioides, the epazote, also known in Brazil as erva-de-santa-maria, Baccharis trimera, there known as carqueja, Maytenus ilicifolia, there known as espinheira-santa, Rhamnus purshiana, the cascara buckthorn, there known as cáscara sagrada, Echinodorus grandiflorus, there known as chapéu-de-couro, Uncaria tomentosa, the cat's claw, there known as unha-de-gato, Mimosa tenuiflora, the tepezcohuite, there known as jurema-preta, among others.

Indigenous teas
There are many indigenous herbs consumed as herbal teas in Brazil, which often have traditional medicinal uses. Some varieties are consumed as part of native religious rituals.

Mint tea
Mint tea, an infusion made from the brewed leaves of the plant Hyptis crenata, has been used by traditional healers to cure headaches, fevers and flu. Graciela Rocha, in research conducted for Newcastle University, found the drink to be as effective as a synthetic aspirin-style drug, Indometacin:

Ayahuasca
Ayahuasca, which means "vine of souls" in a Quechua language, has a history going back to ancient times. It is a traditional drink used in spiritual and healing rituals. The drink is used in the religions of Santo Daime and "União do Vegetal". It has purgative, nauseating and hallucinogenic properties.

Due to its hallucinogenic effects, its legal status in Brazil has met with controversy from authorities outside Brazil. The active ingredient that produces hallucinations, DMT, is considered a Class A drug (the same label given to heroin and cocaine) by the U.S. and the U.K. However, in 2010 Brazil's national anti-drug body approved the consumption of the drink for religious rituals after decades of studies and talks with religious institutions.

History
During the colonial era, imported tea varieties were first cultivated in Brazil in 1812. Throughout the 19th century, the tea industry, much like the coffee industry, was heavily dependent on slave labor to work on the plantations. When slavery was abolished in 1888, the tea trade collapsed. In the 1920s, the tea industry was revived by Japanese immigrants, who introduced tea seeds from Sri Lanka and India. Prior to this time, only Chinese tea varieties had been grown in Brazil.

Brazil's largest tea-producing region is near Registro, a coastal city near São Paulo. Registro is in the Brazilian Highlands and forms a terrain of low rolling hills that are ideal for mechanized tea production. The growing season in Brazil is from September to April; the climate is hot and humid. The relatively low altitude of most of Brazil's tea plantations, however, produces a tea which is less flavorful than high altitude teas. For this reason, Brazilian teas are most often produced for blending. The tea is used for both iced tea and hot tea blends with about 70% of the total tea production being sold to the United States.

See also

 Tea
 Mate (beverage)
 Traditional medicine
 Health effects of tea

References

Tea culture by country
Tea in South America
Traditional medicine
Brazilian drinks
Indigenous culture in Brazil